Bay Area Medical Academy (BAMA) is an accredited school of higher education offering programs for students wanting to train to become a phlebotomist, medical assistant, or pharmacy technician. The school's campuses are located in downtown San Francisco near Union Square and in downtown San Jose.

History
Bay Area Medical Academy was founded in 2005 by CEO Simonida Cvejic. The school was launched and incubated at the Renaissance Center, a local entrepreneurship center funded by the San Francisco Mayor's Office of Economic Development. The school began as a Phlebotomy only school, and then later added Medical Assisting and Pharmacy Technician training.

Bay Area Medical Academy's sister school BAMA Institute was launched in 2017 providing EKG technician and nursing assistant training.

Bay Area Medical Academy holds National Accreditation through the Accrediting Council for Independent Colleges and Schools (ACICS) in Washington, D.C.

Simonida Cvejic and Bay Area Medical Academy's story have been featured in several national publications, including Huffington Post, Forbes, and the San Francisco Chronicle.

Programs of study
Phlebotomy Technician, Pharmacy Technician, Medical Assisting.

References

Educational institutions established in 2005
Universities and colleges in San Francisco
Universities and colleges in Santa Clara County, California
Private universities and colleges in California
2005 establishments in California